The 2011–12 season was Ergotelis' 82nd season in existence, 7th season in the Super League Greece, and the sixth consecutive since the club's latest promotion from the Football League. Ergotelis also participated in the Greek cup, entering the competition in the Fourth Round. Despite the season taking off on a promising start, subsequent weak performances and a disastrous championship second round saw the team finish in 14th place, thus being relegated to the Football League for the second time in its history. A few months later, iconic club president Apostolos Papoutsakis died at the age of 60.

Players

The following players have departed in mid-season

Out of team 

Note: Flags indicate national team as has been defined under FIFA eligibility rules. Players and Managers may hold more than one non-FIFA nationality.

Transfers

In

Promoted from youth system

Total spending:  450.000 €

Out 
 
Total income:  0.000 €

Expenditure:   450.000 €

Managerial changes

Pre-season and friendlies

Pre-season friendlies

Mid-season friendlies

Post-season friendlies

Competitions

Overview 

Last updated: 29 July 2014

Super League Greece

League table

Results summary

Matches

Greek Cup

Fourth round

Matches

Statistics

Goal scorers

Last updated: 25 April 2014

References

Ergotelis
Ergotelis F.C. seasons